Datis Lorestan Football Club is an Iranian football club based in Khoramabad, Iran. They currently compete in the 2011–12 Iran Football's 2nd Division.

Season-by-Season

The table below shows the achievements of the club in various competitions.

See also
 2011-12 Hazfi Cup
 2011–12 Iran Football's 2nd Division

References

Football clubs in Iran
Association football clubs established in 2009
2009 establishments in Iran